Teeny Rock is a small rock at the northwest end of Williams Hills in the Neptune Range, Pensacola Mountains. Mapped by United States Geological Survey (USGS) from surveys and U.S. Navy air photos, 1956–66. The name by Advisory Committee on Antarctic Names (US-ACAN) alludes to the small size of the feature.

Rock formations of Queen Elizabeth Land